Karma Group is an International hotel and resort company owned by English entrepreneur & hotelier, John Spence. It currently operates 32 properties and brands worldwide.

History 
John Spence founded the company Royal Resorts in 1993, with the group's first property purchased in Goa after Spence identified what he believed was a development opportunity on the west coast of India. The company sold fractional ownership in these Goa properties directly to India's middle class.  Accelerated growth started when the company targeted large numbers of affluent expatriate Indians living in Dubai and Oman. Increased revenues allowed Royal Resorts to expand and build more properties in the region, firstly under the Royal Resorts brand in Indonesia, in the late 90s, and then under the Karma brand with the first property, Karma Jimbaran, opening on the island of Bali in 2005.

By the end of the 1990s, the company had opened 70 sales offices worldwide. In 2003, the group launched the Karma brand as part of a revamped, five-star offering.

The company continued to add properties to its portfolio, notably in Greece (Crete and Mykonos), Indonesia (Bali), India (Kerala and Jaipur), Germany (Bavaria), France (St Tropez and Carcassonne), and the Isles of Scilly(si-lee).

In 2013, John Spence acquired the historically notable Cote D'Azur chateau, Le Preverger, once the home of UK designer Laura Ashley, and added the property to the Karma portfolio.

In 2017, Karma Group entered into an agreement with Sanctum Hotels Group. The partnership is part of a five-year plan to expand the Group's holdings to 60 resorts.

Business model 
Karma Group's business units, being Karma Resorts, Karma Spa, Karma Estates, Karma Retreats, Karma Beach Clubs and Karma Group, generate revenue through timeshare and fractional ownership as well as hotel services such as the standard selling of room nights, onsite spas and dining.

Karma Group generates revenue through fractional ownership and timeshare of Karma properties. Karma villas are presold to investors, who lease the property back to Karma to operate and manage.

The group also allows individuals to invest in timeshare accommodation, where parties are allotted a certain amount of time per year for access and use of the property. The group operates properties in locations as varied as Indonesia (Jimbaran, Sanur, Ubud and Candidasa), Greece (Mykonos and Crete), France (St Tropez and Carcassonne), India (Goa, Kerala and Rajasthan), and Vietnam.

Karma Resorts operates as both owner and management company of Karma's resorts, including properties in Indonesia (Jimbaran Bay, Ungasan and Gili Meno), the UK (St Martin's in the Isles of Scilly), Australia (Rottnest Island), and Germany (Schliersee, Bavaria).

References 

British companies established in 1993
Timeshare chains